Ruth Evelyn Martin (3 October 1913 – 11 September 2004) was a New Zealand cricketer who played as a right-handed batter and right-arm medium bowler. She played one Test match for New Zealand, their first, in 1935. She played domestic cricket for Canterbury.

Symons captained Canterbury, and she was selected to captain New Zealand in their first women's Test match, against England in Christchurch in February 1935, which England won. In Canterbury's victory over Otago in March 1937 she took 6 for 6 and 3 for 23.

She married Lester Martin at St Mark's Church, near her home in Opawa, Christchurch, in April 1935. She died in Christchurch in 2004.

References

External links
 
 

1913 births
2004 deaths
Cricketers from Christchurch
New Zealand women cricketers
New Zealand women Test cricketers
New Zealand women cricket captains
New Zealand women's Test captains
Canterbury Magicians cricketers